Kim Dae-kyung (born October 17, 1987) is a South Korean football player who plays for Thai Division 1 League club for Rajnavy Rayong FC.

Kim played one game for Jeju United in the 2008 Hauzen Cup.

References

1987 births
Living people
South Korean footballers
South Korean expatriate footballers
Jeju United FC players
K League 1 players
Korea National League players
Expatriate footballers in Thailand
South Korean expatriate sportspeople in Thailand
Association football midfielders